Michael Vincent Dugher (pronounced ; born 26 April 1975) is a former British Labour politician who was elected as the Member of Parliament (MP) for Barnsley East at the 2010 general election. He has held several senior positions within the party, including Shadow Secretary of State for Transport and Shadow Secretary of State for Culture, Media and Sport. He did not stand at the 2017 general election.

In April 2017, Dugher was announced as UK Music's new chief executive, replacing outgoing chief executive Jo Dipple. He took up the role in May 2017. In February 2020, he became Chief Executive of the Betting and Gaming Council (BGC).

Early life and career
Born and raised in Edlington, South Yorkshire, where he was educated. He also attended The McAuley School in Doncaster and read Politics at the University of Nottingham. He was national chairman of Labour Students in 1997.

He was the Head of Policy of the Amalgamated Engineering and Electrical Union in 2000 to 2001.

From 2001–2002, Dugher was a special adviser to Transport Minister John Spellar at the Department of Transport, Local Government and Regional Affairs. After this, he worked as a special adviser to Geoff Hoon from 2002–2008. Hoon was successively the Secretary of State for Defence, the Leader of the House of Commons and the Government Chief Whip. During 2006–2007, Dugher worked as a corporate lobbyist for American multinational Electronic Data Systems (EDS), one of the government's largest IT contractors.

Dugher worked at 10 Downing Street from 2008–2010 as the Chief Political Spokesman for Prime Minister Gordon Brown.

Parliamentary career
Before his election at the 2010 general election as the MP for Barnsley East, Dugher stood unsuccessfully for Skipton and Ripon, then held by the Conservative David Curry, at the 2001 general election.

Dugher was a Shadow Minister of Defence before becoming the Parliamentary Private Secretary to the Leader of the Opposition. In 2011, he was promoted to Ed Miliband's Shadow Cabinet as Shadow Minister without Portfolio, a role in which he co-ordinated shadow ministers' responses to the government.

In November 2012, Miliband appointed Dugher to the position of Labour Party Vice Chair with responsibility for communications strategy.

In the October 2013 reshuffle, he became Shadow Minister for the Cabinet Office and in November 2014 was appointed Shadow Secretary of State for Transport replacing Mary Creagh. As Shadow Secretary of State for Transport, Dugher told the New Statesman that he wanted to see "more public control of the railways" under a Labour government.

Dugher has been an Executive Committee member of the British-American Parliamentary Group.

In the Labour leadership election of 2015, he was campaign manager for Andy Burnham. He was also a supporter of Tom Watson for the deputy leadership election.

In September 2015, Dugher replaced Chris Bryant as Shadow Secretary of State for Culture, Media and Sport. However, in January 2016, he was sacked from the position in Jeremy Corbyn's first reshuffle, as announced by Dugher himself via Twitter. Dugher did not take telephone calls from Corbyn the previous day. Several shadow cabinet ministers publicly supported Dugher, with Andy Burnham saying that "Michael Dugher is Labour to the core & has served our Party with distinction". Dugher said that Corbyn did not like an article he had written for the New Statesman, saying "I took a decision to speak out and I paid a price for it". Dugher described his article "I said despite all the stuff you’ve read in the newspapers: I don’t think Jeremy Corbyn is a man motivated by revenge, I didn’t think he’ll do these mass sackings as an act of revenge over Syria that we’ve read about every day, every week, for several weeks. I was defending Jeremy and I was defending the 'new politics'".

He did not stand in the 2017 general election, stating, "It's time now for me to make a difference in life outside of politics. It's also time that I do what is best for my wife and children, whom I love with all my heart."

Political views 
Dugher has held the post of Vice-Chair of Labour Friends of Israel (LFI). He has criticised the Boycott, Divestment and Sanctions (BDS) campaign, saying "Boycotting Israeli institutions is ignorant, wrong and counterproductive to peace. We should be building bridges and furthering dialogue".

He gave a keynote speech at the 'We Believe in Israel’ conference, where he said "Each time I visit Israel, my admiration for that great country grows".

Following the 2015 general election, Dugher said Labour mishandled its relationship with the Jewish community through a combination of neglect and incompetence.
He criticised Labour's response to the 2014 Gaza conflict and called the then Labour leader Ed Miliband’s decision to whip Labour MPs to vote for a motion recognising the State of Palestine as "catastrophic". Dugher abstained in the parliament vote on this matter, despite a three line whip and being a shadow cabinet minister.

Controversy 
Dugher is a prolific Twitter user. He has regularly engaged in debate with Matt Zarb-Cousin, a former Labour activist and recovering gambling addict. Dugher repeatedly branded Zarb-Cousin, a safer gambling campaigner '#RouletteBoy' in an argument on Twitter in 2017. Dugher, who is the Chief Executive of the UK's Betting and Gaming Council, a lobbying group campaigning for the gambling industry, asked "I thought you liked casinos, young Matt?". He later deleted the tweet, and apologised for his comments and claimed he was not mocking Zarb-Cousin's addiction.

The exchange was later reported by The Daily Telegraph and The Guardian, adding that Dugher had attacked a first of its kind, peer-reviewed study into gambling behaviour published by the academic journal Nature Human Behaviour, calling it 'condescending'. The Betting and Gaming Council 'refused to comment' on Dugher's tweets.

References

External links
Official website

|-

|-

|-

|-

|-

1975 births
Living people
Alumni of the University of Nottingham
British Roman Catholics
British special advisers
Labour Party (UK) MPs for English constituencies
Labour Party (UK) officials
Labour Friends of Israel
UK MPs 2010–2015
UK MPs 2015–2017